Gösta Nilsson may refer to:

 Gösta Stevens (1897–1964), Swedish screenwriter and film director, also known as Gösta Nilsson
 Gösta Nilsson (footballer), Swedish footballer

See also
 Gösta Adrian-Nilsson (1884–1965), Swedish artist and writer